The 2010–11 Syrian Premier League season is the 40th since its establishment. Al-Jaish are the defending champions, having won their 11th Syrian League title in the previous season for the first time since 2003. The campaign began on 29 October 2010 and will end in May 2011. A total of 14 teams contest the league, 12 of which already contested in the 2009–10 season and two of which were promoted from the League 2nd Division.

The season was suspended due to the ongoing events of 2011 in Syria.

Teams
Jableh, and Afrin were relegated to the League 2nd Division after finishing the 2009–10 season in the bottom two places. Afrin made their immediate return to the second level after just one year in the Syrian top flight, while Jableh ended more than a thirteen-year tenure in Syrian League Where he achieved, including the league title once and runner-up time.

The relegated teams were replaced by 2009–10 2nd Division champion North Group Al-Futowa from Deir ez-Zor and The champion of the southern group Hutteen from Latakia. Hutteen and Al-Futowa returned to the highest Syrian football league for the after one year just in the 2nd Division.

Stadia and locations

Personnel and sponsoring

Managerial changes

League table

Results

Play-off for AFC Cup qualification
Since the season was suspended, no league champion was awarded for 2010–11. To decide which team would represent Syria in the 2012 AFC Cup besides cup winner Al-Ittihad, a play-off tournament was organized. Initially three teams were involved: Al-Wahda, Al-Jaish and Al-Shorta. Al-Wahda later withdrew, so Al-Jaish and Al-Shorta played two games to determine the winner.

Al-Shorta won 1–0 on aggregate and qualified for the 2012 AFC Cup group stage.

Season statistics

Top goalscorers
Including matches played on 20 March 2011

 Source: Kooora and syrian-soccer 
 Last updated: 20 March 2011

Scoring
 First goal of the season:  Jaja Santana for Al-Wathba against Al-Karamah, 7 minutes (29 October 2010).
 Fastest goal in a match: 7 minutes –  Jaja Santana for Al-Wathba against Al-Karamah (29 October 2010).

Discipline
 First red card of the season:  Zakariya Bodaqa for Omayya against Tishreen,  90 minutes (29 October 2010).

References

External links
 Details at goalzz.com
  Details at syrian-soccer.com
  Details at kooora.com

Syrian Premier League seasons
1
Syria